Alan Paul Jeans (born 18 May 1958) is a British Anglican priest. He has been the Archdeacon of Sarum, in the Church of England Diocese of Salisbury, since 2003.

Family and education
The son of Brian Edward and Jacqueline Rosemary Jeans, Jeans was educated at Bournemouth School and Bournemouth and Poole College. He was a building surveyor for ten years (1976–1986) — in 1984 he became a Member of both the Incorporated Association of Architects and Surveyors and of the Institution of Building Control Officers. He married Anita Hobbs in 1981 and they have two children.

Ministry
He started training for the ministry in 1986, at Sarum & Wells Theological College, graduating from the University of Southampton with a Bachelor of Theology (BTh) degree in 1989. He was duly made a deacon at Petertide 1989 (1 July) at Salisbury Cathedral and ordained a priest at St Peter's Church, Parkstone (his title church) the Petertide following (30 June 1990) — both times by John Baker, Bishop of Salisbury. Following a curacy at Parkstone with Branksea (1989–1993), he was Priest in charge at Bishops Cannings, All Cannings and Etchilhampton (1993–1998).

From 1998 until 2005, he was the Diocese of Salisbury's Advisor for Parish Development; he remained in that post when he was installed an Honorary Canon of Salisbury Cathedral in 2002 and when he was collated Archdeacon of Sarum in 2003. He graduated Master of Arts (MA) from the University of Wales, Lampeter in 2002/2003. Alongside his archdiaconal post, he has also served as Rural Dean of Alderbury (2005–2007) and as Diocesan Director of Ordinands (2007–2013). Besides his parish and diocesan posts, he has also been an assistant chaplain to Dauntsey's School (1995–2007), a Chaplain to the Forces (Army Cadet Force, since 2002) and a Proctor in Convocation (2000–2005 and since 2010).

Alan was awarded a military MBE in the Queen’s birthday honours in 2021, for service to the Army Cadet Force.

References

1958 births
People educated at Bournemouth School
Alumni of the University of Southampton
Archdeacons of Sarum
Living people